= Rebecca and Eleazar =

Painting by Bartolomé Esteban Murillo

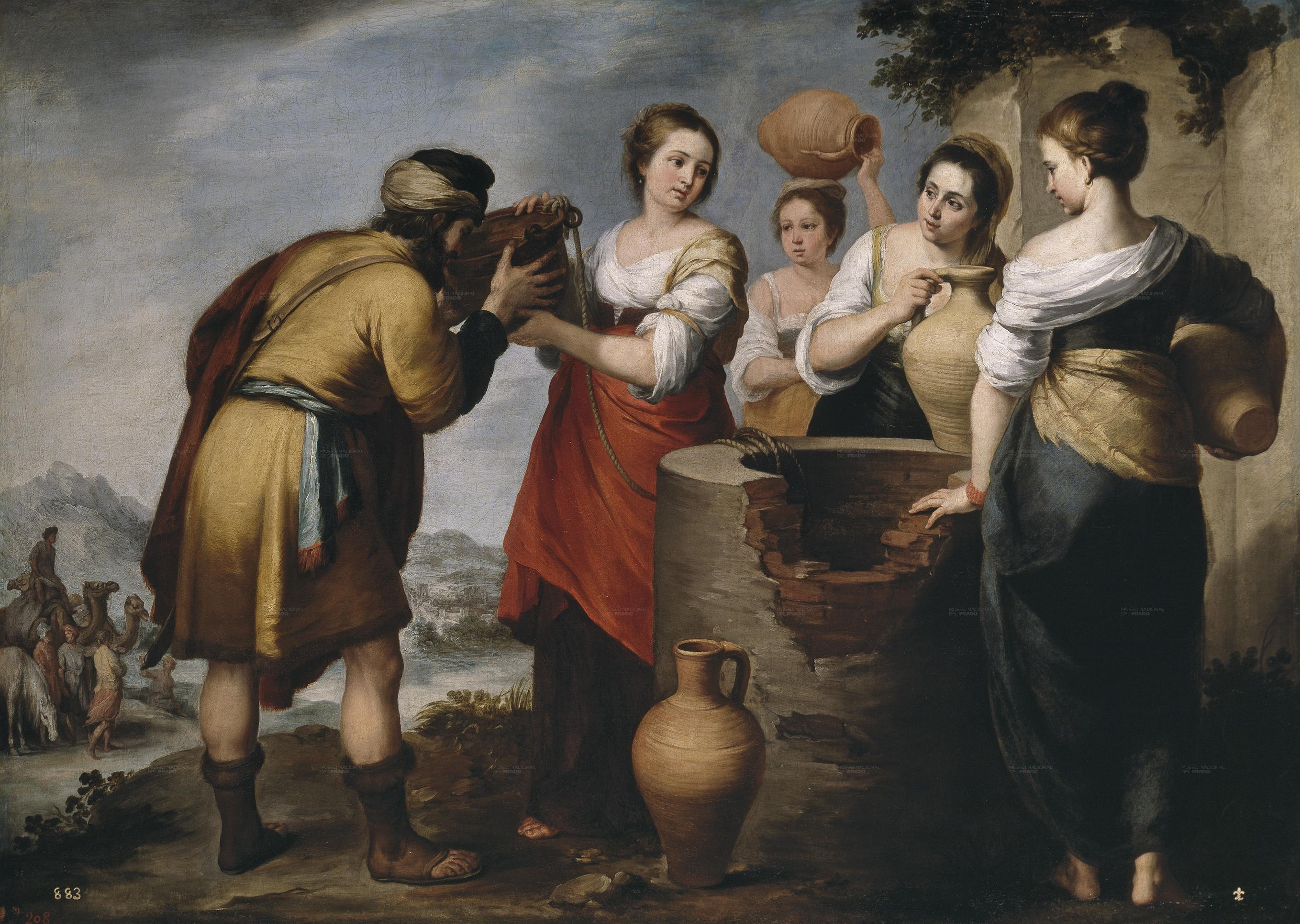
Rebecca and Eleazar (1652) by Bartolomé Esteban Murillo

Rebecca and Eleazar is a 1652 oil on canvas painting by Bartolomé Esteban Murillo, now in the Prado Museum in Madrid. It shows a scene from chapter 24 of the Book of Genesis.
